Turkey took part in the Eurovision Song Contest for the first time in 1975. The country was represented by Semiha Yankı with the song "Seninle Bir Dakika" written by Hikmet Münir Ebcioğlu and composed by Kemal Ebcioğlu. It came last in the Eurovision 1975.

Before Eurovision

Şarkı Yarışması 
The Turkish entry for the Eurovision Song Contest 1975 was chosen during a national final called Şarkı Yarışması.

Competing entries 
105 songs were submitted to TRT and 17 were shortlisted by a selection committee for the national final. In early 1975, "Boşver" performed by Nilüfer withdrew from the selection due to plagiarism claims. "Umut" performed by Şenay also withdrew as Şerif Yüzbaşıoğlu, his wife, was a member of the committee.

On 6 February 1975, the selection committee selected the 8 songs which would compete in the televised final.

Final 
The final took place on 9 February 1975 at the studios of TRT, hosted by Bülend Özveren. Eight songs competed and the winner was determined by a 50/50 combination of votes awarded by public postcard voting and an expert jury. Ali Rıza Binboğa was the winner of the postcard vote. As there was a tie at the end of the voting, the final winner was determined by giving the two winning singers two envelopes to choose between – one being a blank envelope and the other one containing the message "the song which will represent Turkey in Sweden", which was chosen by Semiha Yankı.

At Eurovision
On the night of the contest Yankı performed 13th in the running order following Monaco and preceding Israel. At the close of the voting "Seninle Bir Dakika" had received 3 points, placing Turkey 19th (last). This was the fourth time that a country had come last on its debut.

Voting

References 

1975
Countries in the Eurovision Song Contest 1975
Eurovision